Centrinaspis is a genus of true weevils in the subfamily Curculioninae. Species are found in the Americas.

References 

 Observations on the corn stalk weevil Centrinaspis penicellus. VM Kirk - Journal of Economic Entomology, 1965
 Biology and control of Centrinaspis capillatus (LeC.) in redtop. WH Luckmann and CD Lesar, Journal of Economic Entomology, 1959

External links 

 
 Centrinaspis at insectoid.info

Curculionidae genera
Curculioninae